Charles McKevett Teague (September 18, 1909 – January 1, 1974) was a congressman in the United States House of Representatives from Ventura County, California, from 1955 to 1974.

Early life and family
Teague was born in Santa Paula, California, his family having long been involved in citrus farming. His father, Charles C. Teague, was a founder of Sunkist Growers, Incorporated and his brother Milton headed the organization for some time. He attended the public schools and graduated from Stanford University in 1931 and from Stanford Law School in 1934.

Career
Teague was admitted to the bar in 1934 and in the United States Army Air Forces from 1942 to 1946, being awarded the Air Force commendation ribbon. He served as director of the McKevett Corp. and Teague-McKevett Co., firms later merged with Limoneira. At the time of his first run for Congress, he was president of the Ventura County Republican Assembly.

Teague was elected as a Republican representative to the 84th United States Congress, and to the nine succeeding Congresses. He served from January 3, 1955, until his death from a heart attack in Santa Paula on January 1, 1974. In the House, he served as ranking Republican on the House Agriculture Committee and was also a member of the House Veterans' Affairs Committee. Teague voted in favor of the Civil Rights Acts of 1957, 1960, 1964, and 1968, as well as the 24th Amendment to the U.S. Constitution and the Voting Rights Act of 1965.

His son, Alan, was mayor of Santa Paula.

Teague died of a heart attack at his home in Santa Paula at age 64. He was cremated, and his ashes were interred at the Santa Paula Cemetery.

See also
 List of United States Congress members who died in office (1950–99)

References

1909 births
1974 deaths
20th-century American businesspeople
20th-century American politicians
Businesspeople from California
California lawyers
Burials in Ventura County, California
Stanford Law School alumni
Stanford University alumni
Military personnel from California
United States Army Air Forces personnel of World War II
People from Santa Paula, California
Republican Party members of the United States House of Representatives from California
20th-century American lawyers